The Hampstead War Memorial is located in front of Heath House opposite Jack Straw's Castle, on the northern fringes of Hampstead Heath in London. The memorial marks the deaths of local individuals who died fighting in World War I and World War II. It was dedicated on 4 May 1922 by the Bishop of Willesden, William Perrin, in a ceremony attended by Major General Sir Charles Vere Ferrers Townshend. The memorial is a tall thin stone obelisk on a square plinth with a three-step base.

The memorial has been Grade II listed on the National Heritage List for England since 2015.

References

1922 establishments in England
1922 in London
Buildings and structures completed in 1922
Buildings and structures in Hampstead
Grade II listed buildings in the London Borough of Camden
Grade II listed monuments and memorials
Military memorials in London
Hampstead
Reginald Blomfield buildings
World War I memorials in England
World War II memorials in England